Kahla is a town in Thuringia, Germany.

Kahla may also refer to:
 Kahla, Iran, a village in Iran
 Kahla, Saudi Arabia, a village in southern Saudi Arabia
 Elina Kahla (born 1960), Finnish philologist
 Johann Alexander Hübler-Kahla (1902–1965), Austrian screenwriter and film director

See also 

 Al-Kahla District, in Iraq
 Kalha
 Kalla (disambiguation)
 Khala (disambiguation)